Entalophoridae is a family of bryozoans belonging to the order Cyclostomatida.

Genera

Genera:
 Bicoronipora Walter, 1987
 Bisidmonea d'Orbigny, 1853
 Brachysoecia Canu & Bassler, 1922

References

Cyclostomatida